Grzegorz Szymusik (born 4 June 1998) is a Polish professional footballer who plays as a right-back for Chojniczanka Chojnice.

References

Polish footballers
1998 births
Living people
Association football defenders
Warta Poznań players
Korona Kielce players
Chojniczanka Chojnice players
Ekstraklasa players
I liga players
II liga players
Poland youth international footballers